Damdari Rezania (also Romanized as Dāmdārī Rez̤ānīā) is a village in Baghestan Rural District, in the Eslamiyeh District of Ferdows County, South Khorasan Province, Iran. At the 2006 census, its population was 13, in 4 families.

References 

Populated places in Ferdows County